The Rienzenstock (2,962 m) is a mountain in Switzerland of the Glarus Alps, overlooking the valley of the Reuss near Göschenen in the canton of Uri. It is the culminating point of the group lying west of the Fellilücke.

References

External links
Rienzenstock on Hikr

Mountains of the Alps
Alpine three-thousanders
Mountains of Switzerland
Mountains of the canton of Uri